The Partition of Midnapore (Bengali: মেদিনীপুর জেলা বিভাজন) was the administrative breakup of the Midnapore District of West Bengal, India into the western Paschim Medinipur and the eastern Purba Medinipur districts that became effective on 1 January 2002. With a collective population of 97 lakh or 9.7 million, the undivided district was the largest in terms of population in India and more populous than many countries, including Sweden. With the division of the district, the subdivisions of Medinipur Sadar, Kharagpur, Jhargram, and Ghatal were placed in Paschim Medinipur, with Midnapore, now the district headquarters of only the western half. The subdivisions of Tamluk, Contai, and Haldia were placed in the eastern district with district headquarters at Tamluk. Egra subdivision, a new subdivision of Purba Medinipur, was created out of the Contai subdivision.

Early attempts at Partition
The earliest recorded attempt to divide Midnapore district was announced during the time of the British Raj in 1915. Since, the district was administered by a district magistrate or 'collector'. The idea behind the division was to make the administration of the large district more manageable. The Government of the province of Bengal had floated the idea in 1907, but had not implemented it, due to the volatile situation in the province following the Partition of Bengal. A new district of Hijli was to be set up to help in administration. Midnapore was also a hotbed of revolutionary activity, and it was thought that dividing the district would allow the British rulers to tighten their grip. The announcement of the partition on 26 January 1915 was greeted with protests from zamindars who feared they would be taxed twice if their lands spanned two districts, and by the lawyers of the district court who felt their business would be hurt if another district court was set up at Hijli. Upendra Nath Maity, President of the Midnapore Bar Association commented that the division of the district would be financially unsound since there were, in his opinion, more pressing matters that the administration needed to finance. Birendranath Sasmal, a prominent barrister and politician, initially supported the partition when it was possible that his hometown, Contai, might be the seat of the new district, but opposed it, when Hijli was announced instead. A number of members of the Indian National Congress also opposed the partition citing that they believed the ruling class wanted to break the unity of the politically conscious population of the undivided district. Agitation against the partition continued until 1921, when the whole idea was canned, due to financial reasons.

Partition on 1 January 2002
In independent India, successive governments had expressed a desire to divide the district but this was never done until the government led by Chief Minister Buddhadeb Bhattacharjee finalized the details of the partition and set a date. The mood in various towns in that were affected was variable, as gauged by local newspapers. In general, the event was treated with concern and dismay in Midnapore by inhabitants citing a loss of importance, greeted with parades and other festivities in Tamluk since it was now a district town, and with dismay or apathy in Contai since Contai had failed to become the district town in the newly formed district. The major opposition party, the Trinamool Congress opposed the move, but a section of the media was favorable. Dividing the district, it was felt would help the administration reach the people and assist in providing better healthcare and educational facilities. Opponents mentioned that many of the problems of Naxalite elements would be plaguing the district of Paschim Medinpur and would take up too much of its now limited resources. New administrative and legislative buildings began to come up immediately in Tamluk after the partition came into effect. A new district magistrate and superintendent of police was also appointed.

References

2002 in India
2000s in West Bengal
Geographic history of India
Partition (politics)
Purba Medinipur district
Paschim Medinipur district